The Japan Dome Tour “X” was the fifth concert tour in Japan and eighth overall by South Korean boy band Big Bang. The tour began on November 15, 2014 in Nagoya, and concluded on January 18, 2015 in Osaka. The tour made BigBang the first foreign artist to hold five dome arena concerts for two consecutive years. They gathered more than one million Japanese fans in 2014.

Development
A total of about 3 billion Japanese Yen (~25.5 million USD) was used to produce the stages. Well known production staff also joined the tour, such as Jamie King, the tour director who previously worked with Michael Jackson, Madonna and Britney Spears. Roy Bennett was in control of the stage lighting, while Veneno took charge of the tour videos. The tour utilized a 30-meter center stage, as well as six 50-meter protruding stages, spreading out from the center stage to the audience like the spokes of a wheel. A large number of stage lighting and equipment was imported from countries outside Japan. High-tech equipment, including the LED screens, were set up on the protruding stages, while the multi-cellular speakers ‘MLA,’ presented high quality concerts for the audience.

Set list
This set list is from BIGBANG Japan Dome Tour 2014～2015 [X] (DVD/Blu-ray) - Deluxe Edition.

 "Fantastic Baby"
 "Tonight"
 "Stupid Liar"
 "Blue"
 "Haru Haru"
 "Gara Gara Go!"
 "Top of the World" + "Number 1"
 "Knock Out" (GD&TOP)
 "High High" (GD&TOP)
 "Bad Boy"
 "Tell Me Goodbye"
 "Cafe"
 "Lies"
 "Love Song"
 "Good Boy" (GDxTAEYANG)
 "Hands Up"
 "Feeling"
 "My Heaven"
 "Let Me Hear Your Voice"
Encore
 "Last Farewell"
 Seungri DJ Time:
 "Strong Baby" (Seungri)
 "Doom Dada" (T.O.P)
 "Ringa Linga" (Taeyang)
 "Crooked" (G-Dragon)
 "Look at me, Gwisun" (Daesung)
 "Fantastic Baby"

Tour dates

Personnel

Main
Tour organizer: Avex Group, YG Entertainment
Executive producers – Yang Hyun-suk (YG Entertainment), Max Matsuura (Avex Group)
General producers – Katsumi Kuroiwa (Avex Group)
Tour producer - Veneno
Tour director – Jamie King
Stylist – Yuni Choi, Kyung Mi Kim, Sharon Park
Hair – Tae Kyun Kim, Sang Hee Baek, So Yeon Lee
Make-up – Yun Kyoung Kim, Mi Sug Shin, Jun Hee Lee
Lighting director – Roy Bennett

Band
BigBang (G-Dragon, T.O.P, Taeyang, Daesung, Seungri) – Lead vocals
Gil Smith II (Music Director/Keyboard 1)
Omar Dominick Jr. (AMD/Bass)
Dante Jackson (Keyboard 2)
Justin Lyons (Guitar)
Bennie Rodgers II (Drums/Percussions)
Adrian "AP" Porter (Pro Tools Programmer)

Dancers
 HI-TECH (Heeyun Kim, Jung Heon Park, Young Sang Lee Sung Min Cho, Han Sol Lee, Byoung Gon Jung, Woo Ryun Jung, Young Deuk Kwon, Young Don Kwon)
 CRAZY (Jung Hee Kim, Ah Yeon Won, Eun Young Park, Min Jung Kim, Hee Yun Kim, Sae Bom Choi, Jung In Bae, Hye Jin Choi, Hyo Jung Bae, Ji Won Lee, Jae Hee Ryu, Ji Young Yoo)

References

External links
 Official website

2014 concert tours
2015 concert tours
BigBang (South Korean band) concert tours
Concert tours of Japan